Vyacheslav Viktorovich Fomin (born 7 March 1969) is a former Russian football player.

External links
 

1969 births
Living people
Soviet footballers
Russian footballers
Association football midfielders
Russian Premier League players
PFC Krylia Sovetov Samara players
FC Neftekhimik Nizhnekamsk players